Uri Banin (Hebrew: אורי בנין) is an Israeli chemist and a professor at the Hebrew University of Jerusalem, currently holding the Alfred & Erica Larisch Memorial Chair at the Institute of Chemistry. He is recognized as one of the pioneers of nanoscience in Israel.

Biography and studies 
Following his military service, in 1986 Banin proceeded on to his academic career, receiving his Bachelor of Science degree in chemistry and physics from the Hebrew University of Jerusalem in 1989. He later received PhD from the Hebrew University, under the supervision of Sanford Ruhman in the field of femtosecond spectroscopy, studying the ultrafast dynamics of triiodide in solution.

Scientific career 
In 1994 Banin joined the group of Paul Alivisatos in UC Berkeley as a postdoctoral researcher, studying the physical chemistry of semiconductor nanocrystals. In 1997 he joined the Institute of Chemistry at the Hebrew University of Jerusalem as a senior lecturer, becoming a full professor in 2004.

In the early days of his independent career at the Hebrew University, Banin used tunneling spectroscopy techniques in order to study the electronic properties of semiconductor nanocrystals, ultimately reporting the identification of atomic-like electronic states in 1999 in Nature. His later work has diverged in the directions of both synthesis of novel semiconductor-based nanomaterials, the physical characterization of such nanostructures, as well as various applications. In 2003 his group has reported the first successful growth of colloidal zinc-blende lattice III-V semiconductor nanorods. Continuing the work on III-V semiconductor nanocrystals, the group has published the synthesis of bright near-infrared-emitting core/shell nanocrystals, later employing them in a novel nanocrystal-polymer near-infrared light-emitting diode. In 2011 the group reported a simple procedure for the doping on nanocrystals, allowing the synthesis of heavily-doped p-type and n-type semiconductor nanocrystals.

Some of his earlier works include the study of cadmium chalcogenide molecular clusters as a step between complexes and nanocrystals with semiconducting properties. Setting this work aside since 2002, his next paper on the subject was only in 2017 reporting magic sized InP and InAs clusters. Subsequent work on related clusters with the groups of Richard D. Robinson and Tobias Hanrath has finally lead to the discovery of the reversible isomerization of inorganic clusters – a discovery made by chance during the shipping of the samples. This work was called "the final bridge" between molecules and nanocrystals.

One of the most recognized contribution of Banin to the field of colloidal nanostructures is the first demonstration of selective metal growth on semiconductor nanocrystals, resembling well-known bulk systems such as the Schottky diode, and the subsequent refinement of related synthesis procedures and the discovery of similar structures, as well as the physical characterization of such systems. To this day, hybrid metal-semiconductor nanostructures are state-of-the-art systems in the field of photocatalysis. One of the breakthroughs made by Banin's lab, employing hybrid metal-semiconductor nanocrystals in water-based 3D printing and photopolymerization of common acrylates. It was also later shown that such approach can also be used for solvent-free photopolymerization and microprinting.

Banin is widely recognized as a pioneer of nanoscience in Israel, founding the Harvey M. Kreuger Family Center for Nanoscience and Nanotechnology in 2001 and serving as its first director for nearly a decade until 2010. He was the chairman of the scientific committee and a co-chairperson of the first international nanoscience conference in Israel in 2009, now an internationally-recognized biennial conference.

In 2009, Banin became the scientific founder of Qlight Nanotech, which was later fully acquired by Merck KGaA for an undisclosed price and is currently located in the campus of the Hebrew University in Givat Ram. In 2019 Nanosys signed an exclusive agreement on quantum dot patents developed in Banin's lab and held by Yissum.

Banin has been an associate editor of the American Chemical Society journal Nano Letters between 2013-2021. In 2020 he joined the Advisory Board of Nanoscale Horizons, a journal published by the Royal Society of Chemistry.

As of 2022, Banin has authored more than 210 papers that have been widely cited. In addition, he has invented more than 35 different patents.

Awards and major grants 

Miller Visiting Professorship, 2019
 Israel Chemical Society Prize of Excellence, 2018
Kolthoff Award from Technion Israel Institute of Technology, 2017
ERC Advanced Investigator Grant, 2017–2022
IVS Excellence Award for Research, 2017
Landau prize by Mifal Hapais (in the field of Applied Nanotechnology), 2015
 Kaye Innovation Award, 2015
Israel Chemical Society Prize in memory of Lea Tenne for Nanoscale Sciences, 2013
ERC Advanced Investigator Grant, 2010–2015
 Klachky Award, 2008
Michael Bruno Memorial Award, 2007–2010
 Hebrew University Rector Prize for excellence in research, 2006
Willstätter Lectureship, 2006
 Kaye Innovation Award, 2005
[Israel Chemical Society Award for Young Chemist, 2001
 The Hebrew University President Young Investigator Award, named after Prof. Yoram Ben-Porat, 2000
Yigal Alon Fellowship for Young Faculty, 1997–2000
 Award of the Ulshwang fund, for research program of the Israel Science foundation, 1998
Bergmann grant for young recipients of the B.S.F research grants, 1997
 Fulbright postdoctoral fellowship, 1994–1996
Rothschild postdoctoral fellowship, 1994–1995

Notable alumni 

Numerous former students and postdoctoral researchers of Banin are faculty members of Israeli and other universities.

 Taleb Mokari, Ben-Gurion University of the Negev.
 Yuval Ebenstein, Tel-Aviv University.
 Guohua Jia, Curtin University.
 Janet E. Macdonald, Vanderbilt University.
 Dan Oron, Weizmann Institute of Science.
 Eli Rothenberg, New York University.
 Amit Sitt, Tel-Aviv University.
 Yehonadav Bekenstein, Technion – Israel Institute of Technology.
 Botao Ji, Westlake University, Zhezheng, China.
 Hadar Steinberg, Hebrew University of Jerusalem.
 Y. Charles Cao, University of Florida.
 Ido Hadar, Hebrew University of Jerusalem.
 Dirk Dorfs, Leibniz University Hannover.
 Jiajia Ning, Jilin University, Changchun, China.

References 

Israeli chemists
Israeli scientists
University of California, Berkeley alumni
Hebrew University of Jerusalem alumni
Academic staff of the Hebrew University of Jerusalem
Israeli nanotechnologists
Jewish scientists
Living people
1962 births
Jewish chemists